Rik-e Haviq (also Romanized as Rīk-e Ḩavīq; also known as Rīk, Rīk-e Noşratābād, and Rīk Maḩalleh-ye Ḩavīq) is a village in Haviq Rural District, Haviq District, Talesh County, Gilan Province, Iran. At the 2006 census, its population was 924, in 194 families.

References 

Populated places in Talesh County